Mexico–South Korea relations are the bilateral relations between Mexico and South Korea. There are an estimated 15,000 Koreans and Mexicans of Korean descent living in Mexico. Both nations are members of the Asia-Pacific Economic Cooperation, G-20 major economies, Organisation for Economic Co-operation and Development and the United Nations.

History

The first contact between the peninsula of Korea and Mexico took place when Spanish born and Mexican born Jesuits from New Spain (modern-day Mexico) arrived to Korea to preach Christianity. Since initial contacts, there would be almost no further direct contact between the two nations and any contact at all would have been done with Korean trading ships coming to Manila (capital of the Spanish crown in the Philippines) and their goods and merchandise traveling by Spanish galleons to present day Mexico. In 1905, a Korean ship called the Ilford arrived in southern Mexico carrying approximately 1,033 Korean migrants. These migrants eventually settled in the Mexican state of Yucatán.

During the Korean War, unlike several Latin-American nations, Mexico decided to remain neutral and not send troops to the Korean peninsula. On 26 January 1962, Mexico and South Korea formally established diplomatic relations. That same year, South Korea opened an embassy in Mexico City. Initially, Mexico conducted relations with South Korea from its embassy in Tokyo, Japan. In March 1968, South Korea dedicated a Friendship Pavilion to Mexico and placed it in Chapultepec Park. In 1978, Mexico opened an embassy in Seoul.

In 1991, South Korean President Roh Tae-woo became the first Korean head of state to visit Mexico and Latin-America. In 1996, Mexican President Ernesto Zedillo reciprocated the visit to South Korea. Since then, there have been several high level visits between the two nations.

In 2017, both nations celebrated 112 years since the first Korean migration to Mexico. In 2022, both nations celebrated 60 years of diplomatic relations. In July of that same year, Mexican Foreign Minister Marcelo Ebrard paid a visit to South Korea to continue the conversations for a free trade agreement between both nations that were initiated in 2012.

High-level visits

Presidential visits from Mexico to South Korea

 President Ernesto Zedillo (1996)
 President Vicente Fox (2001, 2005)
 President Felipe Calderón (2010)

Presidential visits from South Korea to Mexico

 President Roh Tae-woo (1991)
 President Kim Young-sam (1997)
 President Kim Dae-jung (2002)
 President Roh Moo-hyun (2005)
 President Lee Myung-bak (2010, 2012)
 President Park Geun-hye (2016)

Bilateral agreements
Both nations have signed several bilateral agreements, such as an Agreement on Educational and Cultural Cooperation (1966); Agreement on Economic, Scientific and Technical Cooperation (1989); Agreement on Tourism and Telecommunications (1999); Agreement on the Avoidance of Double-Taxation (2000); Agreement on the Promotion and Reciprocal Protection of Investments (2000); Agreement on Technology and Innovation (2016); Agreement on Clean Energy Cooperation (2016); Agreement on Combating International Organized Crime (2016); Agreement on Higher Education, Health and Social Security (2016) and an Agreement on Intellectual Property (2016).

Tourism and Transportation
In 2016, 45,000 South Korean citizens visited Mexico for tourism. That same period, over 8,000 Mexican citizens visited South Korea for tourism. In 2017, direct flights began between Mexico and South Korea with Aeroméxico.

Trade

In 2012, Mexico and South Korea began negotiations on a free trade agreement. In 2018, trade between the two nations amounted to US$19.1 billion. Mexico's main exports to South Korea include: petrol based products, minerals, seafood and alcohol (tequila and beer). South Korea's main exports to Mexico include: electronic equipment including cell phones and car parts.

South Korea is Mexico's sixth biggest trading partner globally and South Korean foreign direct investment in Mexico between 1999 - 2015 amounted to over US$3 billion. During the same time period, Mexico invested US$200 million in South Korea. There are 1,700 South Korean companies investing in Mexico. Several South Korean multinational companies operate in Mexico such as LG, Hyundai, Kia Motors, Posco, Samsung and many others. Two Mexican multinational companies operate in South Korea: Grupo Promax and KidZania.

Resident diplomatic missions
 Mexico has an embassy in Seoul.
South Korea has an embassy in Mexico City.

See also 
 Koreans in Mexico
 Pequeño Seúl

References 

 
South Korea
Bilateral relations of South Korea